Dandya is a scientific name for two genera of organisms and may refer to:

Dandya (fish), a genus of prehistoric fishes in the extinct fish family Semionotidae
Dandya (plant), a genus of plants in the asparagus family Asparagaceae